The Iowa Official Register, also called the Redbook or Red Book, is a publication of the State of Iowa.  It contains mini-biographies and photos of Iowa's elected and appointed officials, records of elections, essays on selected topics in Iowa history, and general statistics of the state, among other topics.  It was first authorized by law by Iowa's 24th General Assembly in 1892, with an official mandate to include "historical, political, and other statistics of general value, but nothing of a partisan character," though earlier editions had been published, primarily by Iowa Secretaries of State.  The book's origins can be traced to the 7-page 1860 booklet entitled "Eighth General Assembly," and the name "Iowa Official Register" was first used in a 19-page 1873 booklet, though it appeared under other titles during the following years.  It eventually gained the nickname "Redbook" from the fact that since 1907, it has been published with a red cover.  Today, the Register has a fairly-standardized format, including a biannual publication scheme, and runs 450 to 600 pages in length.

References

External links

The Iowa Official Register at the Iowa General Assembly's website.
 
 
 
 
 
 
 
 
 
 
 
 
 
 
 
 
 
 
 
 
 
 
 
 
 
 
 
 
 
 
 
 
 
 
 
 
 
 
 
 
 
 
 
 
 
 
 
 

United States biographical dictionaries
Books about American politicians
Non-fiction books about elections
Current affairs books
History of Iowa
Government of Iowa
Biographies about politicians